The Orchestre Philharmonique de Radio France is a French radio orchestra, affiliated with Radio France.  The orchestra performs principally at the auditorium of the Maison de la Radio in Paris, along with several concerts at the Philharmonie de Paris.

History 
Radiodiffusion Française established the orchestra in Paris in June 1937 under the name of the Orchestre Radio-Symphonique, under the auspices of Les Postes, Télégraphes et Téléphones (PTT) and its minister, Robert Jardillier. The orchestra was initially under the direction of Rhené-Baton, who guided the orchestra until his death in 1940. Eugène Bigot subsequently directed the orchestra musicians through the 1944 Liberation. Following World War II, Henry Barraud became director of music for the ORTF, and reorganised the orchestra, appointing Bigot as its music director in 1947. The orchestra performed regularly at the Salle Érard, and later the Théâtre des Champs-Élysées in the 1950s.

The orchestra was renamed the Orchestre Philharmonique de l'ORTF in 1964. Bigot continued as music director until his death in 1965. Charles Bruck subsequently became music director, from 1965 to 1970. In 1976, the orchestra was further renamed the Nouvel Orchestre Philharmonique de Radio France, with Gilbert Amy as its new musical director under its new name, and Emmanuel Krivine as principal guest conductor. André Jouve was administrator of the orchestra from 1975 to 1981. Marek Janowski became principal guest conductor in 1984, and music director in 1989. That same year, the orchestra received its current name, the Orchestre Philharmonique de Radio France.

Myung-whun Chung served as music director of the orchestra from 2000 to 2015. Chung now has the title of directeur musical honoraire (honorary musical director) of the orchestra. In September 2015, Mikko Franck became the orchestra's music director.  In September 2020, the orchestra announced the most recent extension of Franck's contract, through 2025.

The orchestra has recorded for such labels as EMI, Deutsche Grammophon, Decca, and Alpha.

Names of the orchestra 
 Orchestre Radio-Symphonique (1937–1964)
 Orchestre Philharmonique de la Radiodiffusion Française (1960–1964)
 Orchestre Philharmonique de l'ORTF (1964–1975)
 Nouvel Orchestre Philharmonique de Radio France (1976–1989)
 Orchestre Philharmonique de Radio France (1989–present)

Music directors 
 Eugène Bigot (1940–1945; 1947–1965)
 Charles Bruck (1965–1970)
 Serge Blanc (1973–1975)
 Gilbert Amy (1976–1981)
 Hubert Soudant (1981–1983)
 Marek Janowski (1989–2000)
 Myung-Whun Chung (2000–2015)
 Mikko Franck (2015–present)

See also
 Radio orchestra

References

External links
 Orchestre Philharmonique de Radio France French-language homepage

French orchestras
Radio and television orchestras
Radio France
Musical groups established in 1937
1937 establishments in France
Musical groups from Paris